Caabi El-Yachroutu Mohamed (born 1949) is a Comorian politician. He was the country's Vice-President from May 2002 until 27 February 2006, when he resigned in order to participate in the upcoming election for  a new Union president. He was eliminated in the first round of that election.

Biography 
He previously served as Prime Minister from 29 April 1995 to 27 March 1996 and interim President from 5 October 1995 to 26 January 1996.

He also served as Secretary-General of the Indian Ocean Commission. Later, he was a supporter of Anjouan President Mohamed Bacar. A few days after the March 2008 invasion of Anjouan, which toppled Bacar, he was arrested, having indicated his willingness to surrender to the Comoran army.

References

Yachroutu, Caabi 
Living people
Presidents of the Comoros
Vice-presidents of the Comoros
Finance ministers of the Comoros
Comorian prisoners and detainees
People from Anjouan
Prisoners and detainees of the Comoros
Prime Ministers of the Comoros
Heads of government who were later imprisoned